Isotria verticillata, commonly known as the large whorled pogonia and purple fiveleaf orchid, is an orchid species native to eastern North America.

Distribution
The orchid's native range is across the Eastern United States in the Appalachian Mountains, the central and eastern Great Lakes region, and elsewhere from Maine south to Florida, and westward from Michigan south to Texas. It is also native to Ontario, Canada.

It grows in acidic soils in forests and in peat bogs.

Description
Isotria verticillata is a terrestrial orchid spreading by underground rhizomes.

Its leaves are green above, waxy and a bit whitened below.

The flowers are yellowish-green, up to 110 mm (4.3 inches) across.

References

External links
USDA Plants Profile for Isotria verticillata (large whorled pogonia)
Isotria verticillata in Flora of North America @ efloras.org
Lady Bird Johnson Wildflower Center Native Plant Information Network−NPIN:  Isotria verticillata

Pogonieae
Orchids of Canada
Orchids of the United States
Orchids of Florida
Orchids of Kentucky
Orchids of Maryland
Flora of the Northeastern United States
Flora of the Southeastern United States
Flora of the Appalachian Mountains
Flora of the Great Lakes region (North America)
Flora of Illinois
Flora of Michigan
Flora of Oklahoma
Flora of Ontario
Flora of Texas
Plants described in 1805
Endangered flora of the United States
Flora without expected TNC conservation status